Jerome "Hiana" Thompson, Jr. (born June 4, 1988) is a  professional box lacrosse player for the Georgia Swarm of the National Lacrosse League (NLL). Initially drafted by the Buffalo Bandits in 2011, he gained a roster spot for the 2015 NLL season. He is the brother of fellow NLL players Jeremy, Lyle and Miles. Outside of the NLL, Thompson has played for the St. Regis Braves, Iroquois Ironmen, Onondaga Redhawks, and the Iroquois Nationals.

References

External links
Stats at pointstreak.com

1986 births
Living people
Iroquois nations lacrosse players
Buffalo Bandits players
Onondaga people
Georgia Swarm players
People from Onondaga, New York